is a town located in Abu District, Yamaguchi Prefecture, Japan. The town had a population of 3,372 in 2016.

In April 2022, the town received nationwide attention after it mistakenly transferred its entire COVID-19 relief budget of 46.3 million yen (c. 358,000 USD) to a resident who subsequently lost the money in online casinos.

History 
The town was founded on January 1, 1955.

Geography 
Abu is located within the north of the Yamaguchi prefecture and borders the Sea of Japan on the north.

Neighbouring municipalities 

 Hagi

Transportation

Railway 

 JR West
 San'in Main Line: Utago - Kiyo - Nago

Highways 
Two national routes passes through Abu, which include Route 191 and 315.

COVID-19 Relief Funds Incident 
On April 8, 2022, a municipal official mistakenly transferred Abu's entire COVID-19 relief budget of 46.3 million yen (c. 358,000 USD) to Abu resident Sho Taguchi. After promising to return the payment, Taguchi spent the money in online casinos. The incident drew attention from Japan's national news media. On May 18, Taguchi was arrested and indicted for computer fraud for transferring 42.92 million yen of the 46.3 million yen to three online payment agents, knowing that the payment had been made in error.

On May 24, the mayor of Abu, Norihiko Hanada, announced that almost 43 million yen of the money had been recovered. On August 1, Taguchi was released on bail after paying 2.5 million yen, and commented that he is going to work and gradually pay the money back.

References

External links
Abu official website (in Japanese)

Towns in Yamaguchi Prefecture